Tebay is a civil parish in the Eden District, Cumbria, England.  It contains nine listed buildings that are recorded in the National Heritage List for England.  All the listed buildings are designated at Grade II, the lowest of the three grades, which is applied to "buildings of national importance and special interest".  The parish contains the village of Tebay, but consists mainly of countryside and moorland.  The River Lune passes through the parish, and two bridges crossing it are listed.  The other listed buildings consist of farmhouses and farm buildings, a house, and a church with associated structures.


Buildings

References

Citations

Sources

Lists of listed buildings in Cumbria